Huamatambo District is one of thirteen districts of the province Castrovirreyna in Peru.

References